Miserentissimus Redemptor is the title of an encyclical by Pope Pius XI, issued on May 8, 1928 on reparation to the Sacred Heart. This encyclical deals with  the concepts of Acts of Reparation and atonement. 

Referencing Pope Leo XIII's encyclical, Annum sacrum, Pius stated, "For as in olden time when mankind came forth from Noe's ark, God set His "bow in the clouds" (Genesis ix, 13), shining as the sign of a friendly covenant; so in the most turbulent times of a more recent age, ... then the most benign Jesus showed his own most Sacred Heart to the nations lifted up as a standard of peace and charity portending no doubtful victory in the combat." 

In this encyclical Pope Pius XI discussed reparation as follows:

"The creature's love should be given in return for the love of the Creator, another thing follows from this at once, namely that to the same uncreated Love, if so be it has been neglected by forgetfulness or violated by offense, some sort of compensation must be rendered for the injury, and this debt is commonly called by the name of reparation."

Having discussed the need for reparation, Pius raised the importance of the Feast of the Sacred Heart of Jesus as a day of reparation.

In the opening section of the encyclical, the Pope stated that Jesus Christ had "manifested Himself" to Margaret Mary Alacoque and had "promised her that all those who rendered this honor to His Heart would be endowed with an abundance of heavenly graces". At the end the encyclical it is supplemented by a "Prayer of Reparation".

See also
Acts of Reparation to Jesus Christ
Quas primas

References

External links
 "Miserentissimus Redemptor"

Documents of Pope Pius XI
1928 documents
1928 in Christianity
May 1928 events
Papal encyclicals